Philip Clayton may refer to:
 Tubby Clayton (1885–1972), English Anglican clergyman and the founder of Toc H 
 Philip Clayton (philosopher) (born 1956), American Christian philosopher